Otjiwarongo is a city of 28,000 inhabitants in the Otjozondjupa Region of Namibia. It is the district capital of the Otjiwarongo electoral constituency and also the capital of Otjozondjupa.

Otjiwarongo is situated in central-north Namibia on the TransNamib railway. It is the biggest business centre for Otjozondjupa Region. Otjiwarongo is located on the B1 road and its links between Windhoek, the Golden Triangle of Otavi, Tsumeb and Grootfontein, and Etosha National Park. It is one of Namibia's fast-growing towns, with a neat and peaceful quality environment and many excellent facilities, including supermarkets, banks, lodges, and hotels. Some of Namibia's best-known private game farms and nature reserves are located in and around the town.

Otjiwarongo is one of Namibia's towns with a large population of German-speaking people. German influence is also evident in its Germanic buildings. The school "Donatus School Otjiwarongo" (D.S.O.) was once known as "Deutsche Schule Otjiwarongo".

History

The San and Damaras where the first settlers of the area, the Damaras from the Geio-Daman clan lived in the area from as early as 1390. The Damaras also named the city ǂKhanubes. German Namibians first settled in Otjiwarongo in 1900. A bloody war was fought in the area between the Hereros and the Germans in 1904 where many of the Herero people died. This happened sometime before Otjiwarongo was established as an administration point for the Germans and officially became a town. A narrow-gauge railway was built from Swakopmund on the coast, to the Otavi copper mine which helped Otjiwarongo become a prosperous agricultural centre. The three tribes where separated like in many of Namibia's towns, where each lived in a separate neighborhood: Ovambo Location, Damara Location and Herero Location respectively. The three locations together made up the suburb of Orwetoveni.

Economy

Mining

The mine is a potential resource for rare-earth elements. Together, mining contributes about 20% of the town's economy.

Health facilities
Otjiwarongo District State Hospital is the biggest hospital in the town and very soon a Referral State Hospital will be built, it is mostly used by the middle and low income residents. A number of private clinics and hospitals are also present in the town, including a branch of MediCity Private Clinic.

Tourism
The main interest for tourists is Otjiwarongo's proximity to the Waterberg Plateau Park. Otjiwarongo is home to the Cheetah Conservation Fund, an internationally recognized organization dedicated to ensuring the long-term survival of the cheetah through research, conservation and education.  Also about 50 miles from Otjiwarongo is Okonjima, the home of the Africat Foundation, a cheetah and leopard rehabilitation centre.

On the edge of town is the Crocodile Ranch, one of the few captive breeding programs for the Nile Crocodile that has been registered with CITES.

Built 15 km outside of town, the Omatjenne Dam provides artificial recharge of local groundwater.

Transport

Otjiwarongo has a well-developed road network. It is situated at the junction of the national road B1 that passes north–south through all of Namibia, the C38 to Outjo and further into Kunene Region in Namibia's north-west, and the C33 to Karibib, connecting the coastal towns of Swakopmund and Walvis Bay. Roads in town are likewise well-maintained, making Otjiwarongo one of the few Namibian towns that has tarred roads even in the townships.

Otjiwarongo is connected to the national railway grid, run by TransNamib. Otjiwarongo railway station is situated downtown, connecting Otavi and the junction at Kranzberg, and branching off to Outjo. In front of the railway station stands the historic Locomotive No 41, originally brought from Germany to haul ore between Tsumeb and the port at Swakopmund.

The town has an air strip, Otjiwarongo Airport. There are plans to develop an international airport.

Politics
Otjiwarongo is governed by a municipal council that  has seven seats.

The 2015 local authority election was won by SWAPO which gained five seats and 3,901 votes. One seat each went to the Democratic Turnhalle Alliance (DTA, 454 votes) and the United Democratic Front (UDF, 442 votes). SWAPO also won the 2020 local authority election. It obtained 3,128 votes and gained four seats. One seat each went to Independent Patriots for Change (IPC, an opposition party formed in August 2020, 1,208 votes),  Popular Democratic Movement (PDM, the new name of the DTA, 537 votes) and Landless People's Movement (LPM, an opposition party formed in 2016, 488 votes).

Education
There are about 15 schools in Otjiwarongo, three private schools and twelve public schools. All schools final exams for grade 10 and 12 are regulated by the Ministry of Education, Arts & Culture. The schools of Otjiwarongo attract more and more non-resident students. The town also has a community library that caters for reading needs of the towns residents.

There are a number of institution for higher education in the town, as well as the MTI and COSDEC vocational training centres and a convent. The University of Namibia and the Namibia University of Science and Technology had plans to build satellite campuses in the town. The two institutions already have their regional centers in the town where distance students interact with the two institutions respectively.

Public Schools
 Karundu Primary School
 Karundu Junior Secondary School
 Orwetoveni Primary School
 Rogate Primary School
 Spes Bona Primary School
 Vooruit Primary School
 Donatus School Otjiwarongo (until 1995 Deutsche Schule Otjiwarongo)
 Otjiwarongo Secondary School
 Monica Geingos Secondary School
 Paresis Secondary School
 Tsaraxa-Aibes Combined School

Private Schools
 Privatschule Otjiwarongo 
 Otjiwarongo Christian Primary
 Edugate Academy

Previously the German school Regierungsschule Otjiwarongo was in the city.

Language
About 90% of the town's residents speak and understand Afrikaans. About 75% speaks English and 35% German. Other languages includes indigenous languages like Otjiherero, Khoe-Khoe and Oshiwambo.

Sport
Mighty Gunners FC is the town's major football team. Life Fighters (Okahirona) also returned to the Namibia Premier League in 2017 after more than a decade. Mokati Stadium, the smaller of two stadia in Otjiwarongo, is located in Orwetoveni and it is the main football stadium in town. There are also grounds for basketball, netball, and tennis. The largest, Paresis Park also known as "The Show Ground", is located in the upper suburb of the town. It is the towns biggest sport ground and one of the biggest in Namibia. It has two soccer fields and two rugby fields. There are also grounds for hockey, tennis, netball, and cricket. The park is also used to host sport tournaments and business events such as the Otjiwarongo Trade Show. In 2011, it hosted the main event of the 21st Independence Celebrations of Namibia.

Geography

Living conditions
In many of Otjiwarongo's townships residents live in shacks. In 2020 the city had a total of 6,251 of these informal housing structures, accommodating more than 50,000 inhabitants, more than the most recent (2011) census reported as total population figure.

Climate
Otjiwarongo has a semi-arid climate (BSh, according to the Köppen climate classification), with hot summers and mild winters.

Twin cities

Notable residents
 Dan Craven (born 1983), racing cyclist
 Hage Geingob (born 1941), first prime minister and third President of Namibia
 Otto Ipinge, politician, former mayor of the town, former regional councillor for Otjiwarongo Constituency, and current governor of Otjozondjupa Region
 Vekuii Rukoro (1954–2021), lawyer, businessman and the paramount chief of the Herero people
 Agnes Samaria (born 1972), middle-distance runner
 Calle Schlettwein (born 1954), politician, Minister since 2012

References

External links

 Municipality of Otjiwarongo

 
Populated places in the Otjozondjupa Region
Otjiherero words and phrases
Cities in Namibia
Regional capitals in Namibia
German South West Africa
Populated places established in 1906
1906 establishments in German South West Africa
Rhenish mission stations in Hereroland